Nowa Sarzyna is a town in Poland, with 5,970 inhabitants as of 2017. 

The settlement has spent most of its history as a village, which in the 16th and 17th Centuries was plagued by frequent invasion by Tatars.

The first buildings of Nowa Sarzyna were constructed in the late 1930s to house workers of a new chemical plant, built as part of Poland's Central Industrial Region. The town lies on land formerly belonging to the village Sarzyna.   City rights were granted in 1973.  The chemical plant continues to function today as Zakłady Chemiczne "Organika-Sarzyna" S.A. and is the town's largest employer.

Cities and towns in Podkarpackie Voivodeship
Leżajsk County